Våge is the largest village in Tysnes municipality in Vestland county, Norway. The village is the site of Tysnes Church. The village has a ferry quay that has regular connections to Haljem on the mainland in Bjørnafjorden Municipality on the other side of the Bjørnafjorden.

References

Villages in Vestland
Tysnes